Codoi is a small town and township in Lhari County in Nagqu Prefecture of the Tibet Autonomous Region, in China. It had a population of about 16,000 as of 2004.

Administrative divisions
The township contains the following villages:
Rexu Village (热须村)
Zhana Village (扎纳村)
Longzhujiao Village (弄竹角村)
Nimalong Village (尼玛隆村)
Gangga Zhujiao Village (岗嘎竹角村)
Duoqiwu Village (多奇吾村)	 
Zamu Labu Village (杂姆拉布村)
Leyangqia Village (勒央恰村)
Saruduo Village (洒如朵村)
Cuoguo Village (错果村)
Nabu Village (那布村)
Gadang Village (嘎当村)
Muchiqin Village (亩迟勤村)
Gutang Village (古塘村)
Zalule Village (杂鲁勒村)

References

Township-level divisions of Tibet
Populated places in Nagqu
Lhari County